The 1880 Stevens football team represented Stevens Institute of Technology as an independent during the 1880 college football season. The team compiled a 1–4 record and was outscored by its opponents, 20 to 3.

Schedule

References

Stevens
Stevens Tech Ducks football seasons
Stevens football